Pontormo – Un amore eretico is a 2004 film by Italian director Giovanni Fago.

Cast 
 Joe Mantegna as Pontormo
 Galatea Ranzi as Anna
 Sandro Lombardi as Anselmo
 Massimo Wertmüller as Bronzino
 Laurent Terzieff as l'inquisitore
 Toni Bertorelli as il Priore
 Vernon Dobtcheff as Riccio
 Lea Karen Gramsdorff as moglie di Bronzino
 Andy Luotto as Mastro Rossino
 Valentina Fago as Tecla
 Alberto Bognanni as Cosimo I

External links

 

2004 films
Italian historical drama films
2000s Italian-language films
Films directed by Giovanni Fago
2000s Italian films